Eurata igniventris is a moth of the subfamily Arctiinae. It was described by Hermann Burmeister in 1878. It is found in Argentina.

References

 

Arctiinae
Moths described in 1878